The Kamioka Gravitational Wave Detector (KAGRA), is a large interferometer designed to detect gravitational waves predicted by the general theory of relativity. KAGRA is a Michelson interferometer that is isolated from external disturbances: its mirrors and instrumentation are suspended and its laser beam operates in a vacuum. The instrument's two arms are three kilometres long and located underground at the Kamioka Observatory which is near the Kamioka section of the city of Hida in Gifu Prefecture, Japan. 

KAGRA is a project of the gravitational wave studies group at the Institute for Cosmic Ray Research (ICRR) of the University of Tokyo. It became operational on 25 February 2020, when it began data collection. It is Asia's first gravitational wave observatory, the first in the world built underground, and the first whose detector uses cryogenic mirrors. It is expected to have an operational sensitivity equal to, or greater than, LIGO and Virgo. 

The Kamioka Observatory specializes in the detection of neutrino, dark matter and gravitational waves, and possesses other important instruments, including Super Kamiokande, XMASS and NEWAGE. KAGRA is a laser interferometric gravitational wave detector. It is near the neutrino physics experiments.  

The collaboration of LIGO, Virgo, and KAGRA plans to start the next observation run (O4) in March, 2023. KAGRA ended its first observation run on 21 April 2020.

Name
It was formerly known as the Large Scale Cryogenic Gravitational Wave Telescope (LCGT). The ICRR was established in 1976 for cosmic ray studies. The LCGT project was approved on 22 June 2010. In January 2012, it was given its new name, KAGRA, deriving the "KA" from its location at the Kamioka mine and "GRA" from gravity and gravitational radiation. The word KAGRA is also a homophonic pun of Kagura (神楽), which is a ritual dance dedicated to Gods in Japanese Shinto shrines. The project is led by Nobelist Takaaki Kajita who had a major role in getting the project funded and constructed. The project was estimated to cost about 200 million US dollars.

Development and construction
Two prototype detectors were constructed to develop the technologies needed for KAGRA.  The first, TAMA 300, was located in Mitaka, Tokyo and operated 1998-2008, demonstrating the feasibility of KAGRA.  The second, CLIO, started operating in 2006 underground near the KAGRA site. It was used to develop cryogenic technologies for KAGRA.

The detector is housed in a pair of 3 km-long arm tunnels meeting at a 90° angle in the horizontal plane, located more than 200  m underground. The excavation phase of tunnels was started in May 2012 and was completed on 31 March 2014.

The construction of KAGRA was completed 4 October 2019, with the construction taking nine years. However, further technical adjustments were needed before it could start observations. The "baseline" planned cryogenic operation ("bKAGRA") was planned to follow in 2020.

Operational history
After the initial adjustment operations, the first observation run started on 25 February 2020. Because of COVID-19, the observation run was ended 21 April 2020. The sensitivity during this run was only 660 kpc (binary neutron star inspiral range). This is less than 1% the sensitivity of LIGO during the same run, and around 10% of KAGRA's expected sensitivity for the run. Upgrades to improve the sensitivity are ongoing between runs. 

The first detections were made in collaboration with LIGO and Virgo and were reported 11 November 2021.

See also
 TAMA300, an early prototype in Japan.
 CLIO, a current prototype that is developing cryogenic technologies.
 DECIGO, a proposed Japanese space-based interferometer.

References

External
Official page (English)
KAGRA experiment record on INSPIRE-HEP

Interferometric gravitational-wave instruments
Astronomical observatories in Japan
University of Tokyo